Anastasia Vladimirovna Zakharova (born 18 January 2002) is a Russian tennis player.

Zakharova has career-high WTA rankings of 156 in singles and 93 in doubles. Up to date, she has won nine singles and seven doubles titles at tournaments of the ITF Women's Circuit.

Zakharova made her WTA Tour main-draw debut at the 2021 Poland Open, where she received entry into the singles tournament as a lucky loser.

Performance timeline

Singles
Current after the 2023 Thailand Open.

WTA career finals

Doubles: 2 (2 runner-ups)

WTA Challenger finals

Doubles: 1 (runner-up)

ITF Circuit finals

Singles: 10 (9 titles, 1 runner–up)

Doubles: 10 (7 titles, 3 runner–ups)

References

External links
 
 

2002 births
Living people
Sportspeople from Volgograd
Russian female tennis players
21st-century Russian women